Isabella Ragonese (born 19 May 1981) is an Italian actress.

She studied acting at the Teatès School in Palermo, under director Michele Perriera. During her studies, she wrote, directed and starred in several adaptations of his plays. In 1998 she won the first prize at INDA (National Institute for Ancient Drama), with a short essay on the figure of Hecuba. She graduated in 2000 with a diploma in acting.

She starred in her first film Nuovomondo in 2006, directed by Emanuele Crialese.

She is engaged to Samuel Umberto Romano, lead singer of the group Subsonica.

Filmography

Films

Television

Awards 
 Nastro d'Argento for Best supporting Actress 2010: La nostra vita & Due vite per caso (ex-aequo).
 Shooting Stars Award 2012: Ragonese received this award at the 62nd Berlin International Film Festival in February 2012, an annual acting award for up-and-coming actors by European Film Promotion.

References

External links 
 

1981 births
Italian film actresses
Actresses from Palermo
Living people
Nastro d'Argento winners
21st-century Italian actresses